In enzymology, a diacylglycerol cholinephosphotransferase is an enzyme that catalyzes the chemical reaction

CDP-choline + 1,2-diacylglycerol  CMP + a phosphatidylcholine

Thus, the two substrates of this enzyme are CDP-choline and 1,2-diacylglycerol, whereas its two products are CMP and phosphatidylcholine.

Classification 

This enzyme belongs to the family of transferases, specifically those transferring non-standard substituted phosphate groups.

Nomenclature 

The systematic name of this enzyme class is CDP choline:1,2-diacylglycerol cholinephosphotransferase. Other names in common use include:

 1-alkyl-2-acetyl-m-glycerol:CDPcholine choline phosphotransferase,
 1-alkyl-2-acetyl-sn-glycerol cholinephosphotransferase,
 1-alkyl-2-acetylglycerol cholinephosphotransferase,
 alkylacylglycerol choline phosphotransferase,
 alkylacylglycerol cholinephosphotransferase,
 CDP-choline diglyceride phosphotransferase,
 cholinephosphotransferase,
 CPT,
 cytidine diphosphocholine glyceride transferase,
 cytidine diphosphorylcholine diglyceride transferase,
 diacylglycerol choline phosphotransferase,
 phosphocholine diacylglyceroltransferase,
 phosphorylcholine-glyceride transferase, and
 sn-1,2-diacylglycerol cholinephosphotransferase.

Biological role 

This enzyme participates in 3 metabolic pathways: aminophosphonate metabolism, glycerophospholipid metabolism, and ether lipid metabolism.

References

 
 
 

EC 2.7.8
Enzymes of unknown structure